Alexander Tait, Sawney Tait or Saunders Tait (14 August 1720 - circa 1800) was a tailor, a published poet and also a contemporary of Robert Burns who he knew well. Tait was also well acquainted with the published poet and close friend of Burns, David Sillar. Sawney spent much of his life in Tarbolton where he was an active member of the community. His poems were exhibited in the 1896 Burn Exhibition, a copy being loaned by the Mitchell Library. Alexander was generally known locally as 'Whip-the-cat' an old expression that referred to itinerant tailors, etc. who went from door to door to do work for others.

Life and background

A lifelong bachelor, Tait is said to have lived in a small two-storied cottage on the west side of Montgomerie Street near the entrance to the school, occupying the garret of the building with only a large tame rat for company. His friend came to an untimely end when a female visitor encountered his pet and a male friend killed the unsuspecting rodent.

He is thought to have been born at Innerleithen, Peeblesshire, the home territory of the Clain Tait, where he seems to have had a limited education. He travelled a great deal in the South of Scotland in his early years as a pedlar, then he worked at mantua-making, selling gown-pieces to ladies and then making up the dress in the customer's home. Eventually he settled down in Tarbolton and established himself as a respected figure. He was a smart and active with a ready wit, given to lampooning, possessed of a store of amusing stories, was an accomplished rhymester and as such, was much in demand at weddings, bonspiels and other social occasions where his recitations were said to be "unco weel put thegither." He is described as "stout, well formed man of middle stature.

As a tailor he did not claim any particular skill and despite once making a coat in only one day he usually dismissed the vagaries of fashion and worked for 6d a day when the going rate was 8d.

For a time he worked in Paisley as a journeyman for Daniel Mitchell in John Street and during this phase he entertained his colleagues with his rhyming skills, "the smoothest doggrel". It is likely that during his time in Paisley his publication was being prepared for printing.

At the annual 'June Fair' Tait set up an unofficial pub in his house that was well frequented by all, especially younger countryfolk who were attracted by his eccentric behaviour.

Tait was very fond of "Pennystone, a game similar to quoits and was successful at a challenge from a flesher from Ayr.

Poetry
Tait published his "Poems and Songs" in 1790, issued stabbed, probably using the Paisley printer John Neilson. Selling for 1s. 6d. the book was octavo, in half-sheets; 16 x 9.7 cm., trimmed and bound, 304 pages long, copies being privately printed for, and sold by the author only. MDCCXC. The signatures ran from A-Pp4  and the contents were : (i) Title-page; (ii) List of Errata; (iii - vi) Table of Contents; (7 - 304) Text. He published a version of the "Kirk's Alarm" by Robert Burns and added the stanzas "Cessnock Side.." and "Davie Douf ...."

His poem and song titles include a version of Burns's "The Kirk's Alarm" under the title "Composed by Plotcock, the Foul Thief's Exciseman." with some original content; "Sillar and Tait; or, Tit for Tat"; "The Author's Nativity"; "The Lady Ballochmyle's Chariot"; "Colsfield's Hawks and Greyhounds"; "Illumination of Tarbolton on the Recovery of his Majesty"; "Battle of the Largs"; "The Burial of Lord Abercorn" He also composed verses on Loncartie, Dunkeld, Aberlemny, Roslin and other places.

Robert Burns, David Sillar, Claud Alexander of Ballochmyle, his wife Helenora and several others feature in his poems. His poetry has few admirers and Mackay describes his efforts as "Ungrammatical, defective in metre and deficient in rhyme." Paterson states that ".. that his pieces would, in short, be intolerable but for their absurdity, .." Local events and personalities were the subject of his poems, giving them a local significance.

A partial list of the poems and songs in Tait's 1790 publication Poems and Songs 
 Composed by Plotcock, the Foul Thief's Exciseman,
 The Answer to Plotcock,
 Sillar and Tait; or, Tit for Tat,
 The Author's Nativity,
 The Lady Ballochmyle's Chariot,
 Colsfield's Hawks and Greyhounds,
 Illumination of Tarbolton on the Recovery of his Majesty,
 Battle of the Largs,
 The Burial of Lord Abercorn,
 B-rns in Lochly,
 B-rns in his Infancy,
 B-rns's Hen Clockin in Mauchline,
 A Compliment,
 A Journey to Destruction.

Social standing

Tait owned several properties in the village at one point, selling them for reasons unknown and held several posts within the village, recording them in the following verses:

In 1777 he was a prominent figure in the setting up of the Secession or Burgher Church despite objections from the heritors and the parish minister and Tait was central to the supply of dressed stone after shortages had threatened the project.

As related in the first line above he had the ceremonial rank of 'Colonel' in the Universal Friendly Society of Tarbolton, leading the Society's procession through the village that aimed to raise funds to reduce distress and poverty amongst agricultural workers. Tait had earned this rank in competition with William Sillar, David's brother, enrolling many more new members than William.

West Lowland Fencible Regiment
Aged seventy-five Tait was one of the first to join this regiment, newly raised by Major Hugh Montgomerie of Coilsfield. In 1794 Tait is mentioned in "Kay's Edinburgh Portraits" relating that he was eccentric, small in stature, a poet, and showed great loyalty. After the regiment was disbanded Tait returned accompanied by a goat he had somehow acquired and a band of local children who had gone out to lead him home.  Shirtly after, being ill and feeling that his end was nigh he was taken in by William Wallace of Millburn near Tarbolton and died shortly after.

Association with Robert Burns
At the time Robert lived at Lochlie Farm and David Sillar at Spittalside Farm, both close to Tarbolton, so they would have known Alexander Tait well. Tait is said to have once been on good terms with Robert Burns as in his "Poem and Songs" he published, as stated, a version of "The Kirk's Alarm" with two additional stanzas. However he included the work as an occasional piece solely to set up his own poem "The Answer to Plotcock", vigorously satirising Burns's work in inferior verse, but failing to mention his name. Burns's version of "The Kirk's Alarm" did not appear in print until 1801." Plotcock is a sobriquet for the Devil.

It seems that at some stage Burns and his friend David Sillar insulted Tait's poetry and he decided to amply repay the sentiments in verse, composing three scurrilous poems, namely "B-rns in Lochly", "B-rns in his Infancy" and "B-rns's Hen Clockin in Mauchline".

David Sillar's had compared Tait's poetic muse to ".. a tumbling cart, wantin' shoon'". This refers to a type of cart with an ungreased tree axle and no iron tyres, infamous for the almost intolerable screeching sound they made. Tait wrote of Sillar that "There's nane can sound the bawdy horn, like you and Burns." This highlighted the pairs mutual enjoyment of bawdry pursuits. Tait was a much older than either Burns or Sillars and may have been doubly insulted by these young poets usurping his position as the local bard.

Another retaliatory work was "Sillar and Tait; or, Tit for Tat"

Tait undertook to "..trace his pedigree, Because he made a sang on me". Suggesting that Burns had written cutting verses regarding his poetic efforts, however they have not survived.

Tait was well aware of the legal dispute over Lochlie Farm rents, etc. between William Burnes and his landlord David McLure and waded in with his own views:

Not satisfied with this diatribe Tait dedicated a poem entitled "A Compliment" to James Grieve, the unofficial provost of Tarbolton :

In "A Journey to Destruction" he mentions the feud between Burns and McLure:

Jean Armour's second confinement gave Tait another opportunity to deepen his feud with Burns:

Burns had failed to ingratiate himself into the company of the Alexander's of Ballochmyle, however Tait wrote a song that was not only popular locally, but caught the ear of Mrs Helenora Alexander of Ballochmyle and he was invited to visit and to present the piece to the family. Tait was well rewarded for the composition and unlike Burns he became a ".. privileged frequenter of the hall".

Tait's historical significance lies in his association and interactions with the genius of Robert Burns, his verses otherwise would have become forgotten and his publication is a great rarity. In this respect Tait has much in common with John Lapraik and David Sillar who also published their poems and songs with a similar descent into obscurity and financial emabarassment.

Tait concluded his book with the stanza:

See also

 Poems, Chiefly in the Scottish Dialect
 Poems, Chiefly in the Scottish Dialect (Edinburgh Edition)
 Poems by David Sillar
 Glenriddell Manuscripts
 Robert Burns World Federation
 Burns Clubs

References
Notes

Sources and further reading
 Annandale, Charles (Editor) (1890). The Works of Robert Burns. London : Blackie & Son.
 Boyle, A. M. (1996), The Ayrshire Book of Burns-Lore. Darvel : Alloway Publishing. .
 Dougall, Charles E. (1911). The Burns Country. London : Adam and Charles Black.
 Douglas, William Scott (1938). The Kilmarnock Edition of the Poetical Works of Robert Burns. Glasgow : Scottish Daily Express. 
 Egerer, Joel W. (1964). A Bibliography of Robert Burns. Oliver and Boyd .
 Hogg, Patrick Scott (2008). Robert Burns. The Patriot Bard. Edinburgh : Mainstream Publishing. .
 Hosie, Bronwen (2010). Robert Burns. Bard of Scotland. Glendaruel : Argyll Publishing. .
 Lowe, David (1904). Burns's passionate pilgrimage, or, Tait's indictment of the poet : with other rare records. Glasgow : Frederick W. Wilson.
 Mackay, James. A Biography of Robert Burns. Edinburgh : Mainstream Publishing. .
 McIntyre, Ian (1995). Robert Burns: A Life.. New York : Welcome Rain Publishers.
 McQueen, Colin Hunter & Hunter, Douglas (2008). Hunter's Illustrated History of the Family, Friends and Contemporaries of Robert Burns. Published by Messrs Hunter Queen and Hunter. 
 Memorial Catalogue of The Burns Exhibition. 1896. Glasgow : William Hodge & Co. MDCCCXCVIII.
 Noble, Andrew and Hogg, Patrick Scott (Editors). (2001). The Canongate Burns. Edinburgh : Canongate Books Ltd. 
 Paterson, James (1840). The Contemporaries of Burns and the More Recent Poets of Ayrshire. Edinburgh : Hugh Paton, Carver & Gilder.
 Purdie, David; McCue Kirsteen and Carruthers, Gerrard. (2013). Maurice Lindsay's The Burns Encyclopaedia. London : Robert Hale. .
 Westwood, Peter J. (2004). The Definitive Illustrated Companion to Robert Burns. Scottish Museums Council.
 Westwood, Peter J. (Editor). (2008). Who's Who in the World of Robert Burns. Robert Burns World Federation. 

Robert Burns
1720 births
1780 deaths
History of South Ayrshire